Pomeranian is an adjective referring to the historical region of Pomerania, which is today divided between Poland and Germany.

Peoples and cultures
 Pomeranian Balts, ancient western Baltic people
 Pomeranian culture, an Iron Age culture of earlier people in land later called Pomerania
 Pomeranians (Slavic tribe), a medieval West Slavic tribe
 Pomeranians (German people) (Pommern), since the High Middle Ages

Languages
 Pomeranian language, a group of Lechitic dialects spoken by the Slavic Pomeranians of the Middle Ages
 East Pomeranian dialect classified within Low German, spoken by the Pomeranians since the High Middle Ages
 Central Pomeranian dialect classified within Low German, spoken by the Pomeranians since the High Middle Ages

Animal breeds
 Pomeranian dog, a Spitz toy dog breed
 Pomeranian Coarsewool sheep (also Pomeranian sheep, Pommernschaf)
 Pomeranian duck (also Pommern duck, Pommernente)
 Pomeranian goose (also Rügener goose, Pommerngans)
 Pomarine skua, a carnivorous seabird sometimes erroneously called "Pomeranian skua"

Places
 Western Pomerania and Farther Pomerania (before 1945)
 Swedish Pomerania
 Province of Pomerania
 West Pomeranian Voivodeship, an administrative region in Poland (after 1945)
 Pomeranian Voivodeship, an administrative region in Poland
Pomeranian (European Parliament constituency), the corresponding constituency
 Kuyavian-Pomeranian Voivodeship, an administrative region in Poland

History
 Duchy of Pomerania
 House of Pomerania

Military campaigns
 East Pomeranian Offensive, a Soviet advance in late World War II

Language and nationality disambiguation pages